This is a complete list of the operas of the Italian composer Pietro Alessandro Guglielmi (1728–1804).

Ninety-five works are listed below. This does not include a number of doubtful attributions and contributions to operas normally ascribed to other composers.

Genres
Guglielmi composed 33 opere serie. However, he was better known for the style of his less formal works, writing 25 opere buffe (designated as commedia per musica), 25 drammi giocosi, six intermezzi, five farse or farsette, and one serenata.

Following the prevailing fashions, Guglielmi composed mainly three-act operas from the 1760s until the late 1780s, thereafter concentrating on two-act works.

List

References
 

 
Lists of operas by composer
Lists of compositions by composer